Tunstallia aculeata is an ascomycete fungus that is a plant pathogen infecting tea.

References

External links 
 Index Fungorum
 USDA ARS Fungal Database

Fungal plant pathogens and diseases
Tea diseases
Ascomycota enigmatic taxa
Fungi described in 1906
Taxa named by Thomas Petch